ReactOS is a free and open-source operating system for amd64/i686 personal computers intended to be binary-compatible with computer programs and device drivers made for Windows Server 2003 and later versions of Windows. ReactOS has been noted as a potential open-source drop-in replacement for Windows and for its information on undocumented Windows APIs.

ReactOS has been in development since 1996. , it is still considered feature-incomplete alpha software, and is therefore recommended by the developers only for evaluation and testing purposes. However, many Windows applications are currently working, such as Adobe Reader 9.3, GIMP 2.6, and LibreOffice 5.4.

ReactOS is primarily written in C, with some elements, such as ReactOS File Explorer, written in C++. The project partially implements Windows API functionality and has been ported to the AMD64 processor architecture. ReactOS, as part of the FOSS ecosystem, re-uses and collaborates with many other FOSS projects, most notably the Wine project, which presents a Windows compatibility layer for Unix-like operating systems.

History

Early development
Around 1996, a group of free and open-source software developers started a project called FreeWin95 to implement a clone of Windows 95. The project stalled in discussions of the design of the system.

While FreeWin95 had started out with high expectations, there still had not been any builds released to the public by the end of 1997. As a result, the project members, led by then coordinator Jason Filby, joined together to revive the project. The revived project sought to duplicate the functionality of Windows NT. In creating the new project, a new name, ReactOS, was chosen. The project began development in February 1998 by creating the basis for a new NT kernel and basic drivers. The name ReactOS was coined during an IRC chat. While the term "OS" stood for operating system, the term "react" referred to the group's dissatisfaction with – and reaction to – Microsoft's monopolistic position.

In 2002, the ReactOS Foundation was established in Moscow with Maxim Osowski and Aleksey Bragin as executive officers and Vladimir Bragin, Saveliy Tretiakov and Alexey Ivanov on the board of directors. In 2015, the foundation was liquidated.

Internal audit
In order to avoid copyright prosecution, ReactOS had to be expressly completely distinct and non-derivative from Windows, a goal that needed very careful work. A claim was made on 17 January 2006 by developer Hartmut Birr on the ReactOS developers mailing list (ros-dev) that ReactOS contained code derived from disassembling Microsoft Windows. The code that Birr disputed involved the function BadStack in syscall.S, as well as other unspecified items. Comparing this function to disassembled binaries from Windows XP, Birr argued that the BadStack function was simply copy-pasted from Windows XP, given that they were identical. Alex Ionescu, the author of the code, asserted that while the Windows XP binary in question was indeed disassembled and studied, the code was not merely copy-pasted, but reimplemented; the reason why the functions were identical, Ionescu claimed, was because there was only one possible way to implement the function.

On 27 January 2006, the developers responsible for maintaining the ReactOS code repository disabled access after a meeting was held to discuss the allegations. When approached by NewsForge, Microsoft declined to comment on the incident. Since ReactOS is a free and open-source software development project, the claim triggered a negative reaction from the free software community; in particular, Wine barred several inactive developers from providing contributions and formal high level cooperation between the two projects remained difficult . Contributions from several active ReactOS developers have been accepted post-audit, and low level cooperation for bug fixes has been still occurring.

In a statement on its website, ReactOS cited differing legal definitions of what constitutes clean-room reverse engineering as a cause for the conflict. To avoid potential litigation, companies sometimes enact a policy where reimplementation based on disassembled code must be written by someone other than the person having disassembled and examined the original code. ReactOS clarified its Intellectual Property Policy Statement requirements on clean room reverse engineering to avoid potential infringement of United States law. An internal source code audit was conducted to ensure that only clean room reverse engineering was used, and all developers were made to sign an agreement committing them to comply with the project's policies on reverse engineering. Contributors to its development were not affected by these events and all access to the software development tools was restored shortly afterward. In September 2007, with the audit nearing completion, the audit status was removed from the ReactOS homepage. Though the audit was completed, specific details were not made public, as it was only an internal effort to ensure compliance with the project's own policies.

Much of the assembly code that was allegedly copied has also been replaced as a natural progression in ReactOS development, by the developers having reimplemented the functionality in C for portability reasons.

Also, the 2004 leaked Windows source code was not seen as legal risk for ReactOS, as the trade secret was considered indefensible in court due to broad spread.

Axel Rietschin, who is a kernel engineer at Microsoft, claimed that he recognized some specific bits in the ReactOS kernel that are unlikely to result from a clean room reimplementation. He suggests that the project took source code from the Windows Research Kernel, which was licensed to universities and has been leaked multiple times. Internal data structures and variable names have the exact same name in both ReactOS and the research kernel.

Google Summer of Code participation
Starting in 2006, the ReactOS project participated in several Google Summers of Code. For example, in the GSoC 2011, ReactOS mentored a student project which integrated lwIP into the network stack. ReactOS has to date participated seven times in GSoC: 2006, 2011, 2016, 2017, 2018, 2019, and 2021.

Lobbying for support in Russia
Between 2007 and 2015, Russian ReactOS contributors representing the ReactOS Foundation made efforts at lobbying the Russian federal government. , these efforts have not yielded government support for ReactOS, and the Russia-based ReactOS Foundation has been dissolved since November 2015.

 In 2007, then State Duma member and chairman of Russian Center of Free Technologies, Viktor Alksnis met with project coordinator Aleksey Bragin, who gave a presentation and demonstration of the project, showing ReactOS running with Total Commander and Mozilla Firefox. 
 In 2011, a demonstration was given to then president Dmitry Medvedev during a visit to a high school in Verhnerusskoe, Stavropol, attended by one of the development team members.
 On 31 July 2012, Vladimir Putin was also given a demonstration during his visit as President of Russia to Seliger Youth Forum, attended by Marat Karatov, one of the development team members.
 On 1 April 2015, Bragin attended an expert meeting of the Russian Ministry of Communications on reducing Russia's dependency from proprietary software imports. Its minutes name the "creation of an open source operating system based on ReactOS for PCs, laptops and other mobile devices", as well as the "creation of an open source operating system for servers based on ReactOS", placing it second among three named proposals.

Funding campaigns
On 1 May 2012, a €30,000 funding campaign was started to finance additional development projects. At the end of the year, approximately 50% of the funding goal was achieved and it was decided to continue the funding campaign without deadlines. The money went to ReactOS Deutschland e. V.. As the tax law in Germany for this form of a registered voluntary association (Eingetragener Verein) makes it problematic to pay developers directly; indirect possibilities like stipends were evaluated.

Thorium Core Cloud Desktop project
When ReactOS was awarded as Project of the Month on SourceForge on June 2013, a crowdfunding campaign on Kickstarter was announced in an interview with the project's coordinator, Aleksey Bragin. On 23 December 2013 the announced project was revealed as a Kickstarter campaign with the goal of US$120,000 was started. The Thorium Core Cloud Desktop dubbed cloud computing service would use ReactOS as core and could allow the use of Windows compatible applications from mobile devices (like smartphones, tablets), workstations, or any other connected device. On 21 February 2014, fundraising ended short of the target amount, with $48,965 of $120,000 raised, resulting in no transferred money.

ReactOS Community Edition
In April 2014, the ReactOS project announced an Indiegogo campaign to launch ReactOS Community Edition, a version of ReactOS based on the 0.4 release. The flexible funding campaign had a goal of $50,000 with additional stretch goals beyond that. Development of ReactOS Community Edition would be community-centric, with ReactOS users voting and funding to decide which software and hardware drivers the project will aim to support. On 1 June 2014, the flexible crowdfunding campaign on Indiegogo ended, raising $25,141 for the development of the community edition, and the voting process to support hardware and software was started shortly thereafter.

ReactOS Hackfest

The ReactOS project organized a hackfest from 7 to 12 August 2015, in the German city of Aachen. The Hackfest resulted in many features being added to ReactOS.

The second hackfest was organized by the ReactOS project from 14 to 18 August 2017, in the German city of Cologne.

The third and fourth hackfests were organized by the ReactOS project from 16 to 21 August 2018 and from 15 to 20 August 2019 in Berlin respectively.

Release history

Features

Programs
 ReactOS Explorer (File Explorer)
 ReactOS Applications Manager
 Accessories
 Calculator
 Command Prompt
 Notepad
 Paint
 WordPad
 Magnifier
 On-Screen Keyboard
 Remote Desktop Connection
 Multimedia Player (Media Player)
 Sound Recorder
 Volume Control
 Character Map
 Clipboard Viewer
 FontSub
 Keyboard Layout Switcher
 ReactX Diagnostic (DxDiag)
 Registry Editor
 SnapShot
 Task Manager
 Administrative Tools
 Device Manager
 Event Viewer
 Service Manager (Windows service)
 System Configuration (MSConfig)
 Games
 Solitaire (Microsoft Solitaire)
 Spider Solitaire (Microsoft Spider Solitaire)
 WineMine (Microsoft Minesweeper)

Commands

The following is a non-exhaustive list of commands that are supported by the ReactOS Command Prompt.

 ?
 alias
 assoc
 at
 attrib
 beep
 cacls
 call
 cat
 cd
 chdir
 chcp
 choice
 clip
 cls
 color
 comp
 copy
 ctty
 date
 dbgprint
 del
 delete
 delay
 dir
 dirs
 doskey
 echo
 echos
 echoerr
 echoserr
 endlocal
 eventcreate
 erase
 exit
 find
 for
 free
 fsutil
 goto
 help
 history
 hostname
 if
 label
 memory
 md
 mkdir
 mklink
 mode
 more
 move
 path
 pause
 popd
 prompt
 pushd
 rd
 rmdir
 reg
 rem
 ren
 rename
 replace
 sc
 schtasks
 screen
 set
 setlocal
 shift
 shutdown
 sort
 start
 taskkill
 tee
 time
 timeout
 timer
 title
 touch
 tree
 type
 uptime
 ver
 verify
 vol
 whoami
 xcopy

Development

ReactOS core development
ReactOS is primarily written in C, with some elements, such as ReactOS Explorer and the sound stack, written in C++. The project compiles using both MinGW and Microsoft Visual Studio, and contributes to the development of the build systems used through the submission of patches to its components.

The developers aim to make the kernel and usermode application programming interface (API) more compatible with Windows NT version 5.2 (Windows Server 2003) and to add support for more applications and hardware, with plans to target newer versions of Windows as development matures. DirectX support is undertaken through ReactX, an in-house implementation. 2D and OpenGL 3D hardware-accelerated rendering is done natively, while other drawing functionality such as Direct3D is redirected to OpenGL as a stopgap solution, mostly using Wine's code such as WineD3D.

The development progress is influenced by the size of the development team and the level of experience among them. As an estimate of the effort required to implement Windows 7, Microsoft employed 1,000 or so developers, organized into 25 teams, with each team averaging 40 developers. , in the ReactOS entry in Ohloh, the page followed through the "Very large, active development team" link lists 33 developers who have contributed over a 12-month period and a cumulative total of 104 present and former users who have contributed code to the project via Apache Subversion since its inception. In his presentation at Hackmeeting 2009 in Milan, ReactOS developer Michele C. noted that most of the developers learn about Windows architecture while working on ReactOS and have no prior knowledge.

While ReactOS targets currently mainly the x86/AMD64 PC platform, an effort to port to the ARM architecture was at one point "under way", while it did not produce much functionality and was abandoned along with a port to PowerPC, that is no longer actively maintained. Support for the Xbox and the NEC PC-9800, a variant IA-32 architecture, was added through the use of an architecture-specific HAL. Improved 64-bit support for ReactOS is "being worked on", however, development seems to be going slowly.

Collaboration and reuse
While ReactOS has the aim to build a Windows-compatible kernel as open-source software, much of the surrounding required functionality to create a complete OS is already available in the greater open-source ecosystem. 
When available and possible, ReactOS therefore builds on and collaborates with already existing open-source projects. 
Conversely, projects like Wine, and formerly Captive NTFS and Longene re-use the open-source ReactOS code-base as well.

Hardware driver stack
On the hardware driver side, for instance the UniATA project provides Serial ATA drivers for ReactOS. The project has also experimented with using the FullFAT library in its rewrite of its FAT Installable File System. ReactOS makes use of the USB stack from Haiku both as a reference and as a foundation for its USB support. Mesa 3D provides OpenGL rendering.

Networking
ReactOS's network stack is built on the TCP portion of OSKit's port of the network stack in FreeBSD, along with an internally developed implementation for packet-oriented protocols like IP. Later, lwIP was integrated into the ReactOS network stack. Windows network services like LSASS, SAM, NETLOGON, and print spooling are already available as open-source alternative by the Samba/Samba TNG project. A fork of rdesktop is used as an implementation of a client software for Microsoft's proprietary Remote Desktop Protocol.

Wine cooperation

The ReactOS and the Wine projects share the goal to run binary Windows software natively and can therefore share many dependencies and development. ReactOS uses portions of the Wine project so that it can benefit from Wine's progress in implementing the Win32 API. While Wine's NTDLL, USER32, KERNEL32, GDI32, and ADVAPI32 components cannot be used directly by ReactOS due to architectural differences, code snippets of them and other parts can be shared between both projects. The kernel is developed by ReactOS separately as Wine relies here on existing Unix-like kernels.

Separately, the experimental Arwinss branch was created as an alternative means to improve USER32 and GDI32 support through an alternative implementation of the Win32 API. Whereas ReactOS's original Win32 subsystem was closely modeled after its equivalent in Windows, Arwinss combines the architecture of that subsystem with the corresponding implementation in Wine. To this end, Arwinss uses Wine's GDI32 and USER32 libraries with few changes to take fuller advantage of Wine's existing software compatibility. Arwinss also allows the user to optionally use a remote X server instead of a local display.

Other
The Tango Desktop Project initiative provides open-source design guidelines and resources (as icons) for applications on desktop environments. FreeType is an open-source software development library, used to render text on to bitmaps and provides support for other font-related operations. The KernelEx project is a Windows-API extension and compatibility layer project, which provides open-source implementations of some Windows-APIs. Other contributing projects are MinGW, SYSLINUX, adns, ICU, GraphApp, Ext2, GNU FreeFont, DejaVu fonts, and Liberation fonts.

Forks
Forks based on ReactOS are occasionally created:
Ekush OS (2004)
ReactOS Server (2008–2013)
OpenROS (2013)
FusionOS (2013)
ReactOS NG (2015) – aiming for compatibility with Windows 8
Greentea OS (2016-2018) – aiming for accelerated and simplified development

Reception
Various people have acknowledged ReactOS and the implications of having a viable open-source drop-in replacement for Windows. A 2004 article and interview of the German weekly magazine Der Spiegel describes ReactOS as directed at Windows users who want to renounce use of proprietary commercial software without having to switch to Linux. DistroWatch, a Linux distribution's monitoring Web site, also lists ReactOS and describes it as "a free and open-source operating system based on the best design principles found in the Windows NT architecture."

In his column for Free Software Magazine, David Sugar noted in 2006 that ReactOS would allow the use of applications depending on older versions of Windows whose APIs have been deprecated. He also recognized its potential to expand the total deployed base of free software, and as a resource for developers wanting to know undocumented Windows APIs in the course of writing portable applications. PC Magazine columnist John C. Dvorak remarked in 2008 that the Windows NT architecture had remained largely unchanged, making it an ideal candidate for cloning, and believed that ReactOS could be "a bigger threat than Linux to Microsoft's dominance". In response to Dvorak's column, ZDNet technology journalist Dana Blankenhorn noted in 2008 that a lack of corporate sponsors and partners had rendered the project harmless to Microsoft. Echoing this, Thom Holwerda of OSNews in 2009 categorized ReactOS under a family of hobby operating systems maintained only by small groups of developers working in their spare time, lacking the financial support of more mainstream operating systems and the legacy of formerly mainstream ones such as RISC OS.

In October 2015, a Network World review of ReactOS v0.3.17 noted "It's just like running Windows 2000" and praised the application package manager, a feature the original Windows is missing.

Jesse Smith from DistroWatch Weekly reviewed ReactOS v0.4.9, and noted that ReactOS "ultimately had a similar problem: limited hardware support" and is not yet a stable operating system.

Awards
The ReactOS Project won on the annual Seliger Youth Forum "The Best Presentation" award with 100,000 Russian rubles ($2700) in 2011, attended by Alexander Rechitskiy, one of the development team members.

ReactOS was a featured project on SourceForge for the weeks beginning on 27 February 2012, 25 April 2013, and several others. It was Project of the Month on SourceForge for June 2013 and February 2019.

See also

Binary-code compatibility
coLinux, a project allowing Microsoft Windows and the Linux kernel to run simultaneously in parallel on the same machine
FreeDOS, a clone of MS-DOS
eComStation and ArcaOS, two independent proprietary continuations of OS/2 (source code licensed from IBM), which IBM co-created with Microsoft and shares some design elements with MS-DOS and Windows
Haiku, a clone of BeOS
Longene, a hybrid operating system kernel intended to be binary-compatible with both the Microsoft Windows and Linux ecosystems
NDISwrapper, a re-creation of Windows NT kernel parts inside the Linux Kernel to allow the use of Windows drivers in Linux
Wine, a compatibility layer that runs Microsoft Windows applications on Unix-like operating systems
List of alternative shells for Windows
Timelines of: Intel / Microsoft / Microsoft Windows / other operating systems (List)
Comparison of operating systems

Notes

References

External links

 

 
1998 software
Alpha software
Articles containing video clips
Free software operating systems
Free software programmed in C
Free software programmed in C++
Live CD
Operating system distributions bootable from read-only media
Software derived from or incorporating Wine
Upcoming software
Window-based operating systems
X86-64 operating systems
IA-32 operating systems
Works involved in plagiarism controversies